

Africa

President – Abdelmadjid Tebboune, President of Algeria (2019–present)
Prime Minister –
 Abdelaziz Djerad, Prime Minister of Algeria (2019–2021)
 Aymen Benabderrahmane, Prime Minister of Algeria (2021–present)

President – João Lourenço, President of Angola (2017–present)

President – Patrice Talon, President of Benin (2016–present)

President – Mokgweetsi Masisi, President of Botswana (2018–present)

President – Roch Marc Christian Kaboré, President of Burkina Faso (2015–2022)
Prime Minister –
 Christophe Joseph Marie Dabiré, Prime Minister of Burkina Faso (2019–2021)
 Lassina Zerbo, Prime Minister of Burkina Faso (2021–2022)

President – Évariste Ndayishimiye, President of Burundi (2020–present)
Prime Minister – Alain-Guillaume Bunyoni, Prime Minister of Burundi (2020–present)

President – Paul Biya, President of Cameroon (1982–present)
Prime Minister – Joseph Ngute, Prime Minister of Cameroon (2019–present)

President – 
Jorge Carlos Fonseca, President of Cape Verde (2011–2021)
José Maria Neves, President of Cape Verde (2021–present)
Prime Minister – Ulisses Correia e Silva, Prime Minister of Cape Verde (2016–present)

President  – Faustin-Archange Touadéra, President of the Central African Republic (2016–present)
Prime Minister – 
Firmin Ngrébada, Prime Minister of the Central African Republic (2019–2021)
Henri-Marie Dondra, Prime Minister of the Central African Republic (2021–2022)

President –
Idriss Déby, President of Chad (1990–2021)
Mahamat Déby, President of the Transitional Military Council (2021–present)
Prime Minister – Albert Pahimi Padacké, Prime Minister of Chad (2021–2022)

President – Azali Assoumani, President of the Comoros (2016–present)

President – Denis Sassou Nguesso, President of the Republic of the Congo (1997–present)
Prime Minister – 
Clément Mouamba, Prime Minister of the Republic of the Congo (2016–2021)
Anatole Collinet Makosso, Prime Minister of the Republic of the Congo (2021–present)

President – Félix Tshisekedi, President of the Democratic Republic of the Congo (2019–present)
Prime Minister –
 Sylvestre Ilunga, Prime Minister of the Democratic Republic of the Congo (2019–2021)
 Jean-Michel Sama Lukonde, Prime Minister of the Democratic Republic of the Congo (2021–present)

President – Ismaïl Omar Guelleh, President of Djibouti (1999–present)
Prime Minister – Abdoulkader Kamil Mohamed, Prime Minister of Djibouti (2013–present)

President – Abdel Fattah el-Sisi, President of Egypt (2014–present)
Prime Minister – Moustafa Madbouly, Prime Minister of Egypt (2018–present)

President – Teodoro Obiang Nguema Mbasogo, President of Equatorial Guinea (1979–present)
Prime Minister – Francisco Pascual Obama Asue, Prime Minister of Equatorial Guinea (2016–2023)

President – Isaias Afwerki, President of Eritrea (1991–present)

Monarch – Mswati III, King of Eswatini (1986–present)
Prime Minister – 
Themba Masuku, Acting Prime Minister of Eswatini (2020–2021)
Cleopas Dlamini, Prime Minister of Eswatini (2021–present)

President – Sahle-Work Zewde, President of Ethiopia (2018–present)
Prime Minister – Abiy Ahmed, Prime Minister of Ethiopia (2018–present)

President – Ali Bongo Ondimba, President of Gabon (2009–present)
Prime Minister – Rose Christiane Raponda, Prime Minister of Gabon (2020–2023)

President – Adama Barrow, President of the Gambia (2017–present)

President – Nana Akufo-Addo, President of Ghana (2017–present)

Junta Leader  – Mamady Doumbouya, Chairman of the National Committee of Reconciliation and Development (2021–present)
President – 
Alpha Condé, President of Guinea (2010–2021)
Mamady Doumbouya, Interim President of Guinea (2021–present)
Prime Minister –
 Ibrahima Kassory Fofana, Prime Minister of Guinea (2018–2021)
 Mohamed Béavogui, Interim Prime Minister of Guinea (2021–present)

President – Umaro Sissoco Embaló, President of Guinea-Bissau (2020–present)
Prime Minister – Nuno Gomes Nabiam, Prime Minister of Guinea-Bissau (2020–present)

President – Alassane Ouattara, President of the Ivory Coast (2010–present)
Prime Minister – 
Hamed Bakayoko, Prime Minister of the Ivory Coast (2020-2021)
Patrick Achi, Prime Minister of the Ivory Coast (2021-present)

President – William Samoei Ruto, President of Kenya (2022–present)

Monarch – Letsie III, King of Lesotho (1996–present)
Prime Minister – Moeketsi Majoro, Prime Minister of Lesotho (2020-present)

President – George Weah, President of Liberia (2018–present)

House of Representatives  (internationally recognized 2014–2016; unrecognized, rival government 2016–2021)
Head of State – Aguila Saleh Issa, Chairman of the House of Representatives of Libya (2014–2021)
Prime Minister – Abdullah al-Thani, Prime Minister of Libya (2014–2021)
 Government of National Accord  (internationally recognized 2016–2021)
Head of State – Fayez al-Sarraj, Chairman of the Presidential Council of Libya (2016–2021)
Prime Minister – Fayez al-Sarraj, Prime Minister of Libya (2016–2021)
Government of National Unity (internationally recognized 2021–present)
Head of State – Mohamed al-Menfi, Chairman of the Presidential Council of Libya (2021–present)
Prime Minister – Abdul Hamid Dbeibeh, Prime Minister of Libya (2021–present)

President – Andry Rajoelina, President of Madagascar (2019–present)
Prime Minister – Christian Ntsay, Prime Minister of Madagascar (2018–present)

President – Lazarus Chakwera, President of Malawi (2020–present)

President – 
Bah Ndaw, Interim President of Mali (2020–2021)
Assimi Goïta, Interim President of Mali (2021–present)
Prime Minister – 
Moctar Ouane, Interim Prime Minister of Mali (2020–2021)
Choguel Kokalla Maïga, Interim Prime Minister of Mali (2021–present)

President – Mohamed Ould Ghazouani, President of Mauritania (2019–present)
Prime Minister – Mohamed Ould Bilal, Prime Minister of Mauritania (2020–present)

President – Pritvirajsing Roopun, President of Mauritius (2019–present)
Prime Minister – Pravind Jugnauth, Prime Minister of Mauritius (2017–present)

Monarch – Mohammed VI, King of Morocco (1999–present)
Prime Minister – 
Saadeddine Othmani, Head of Government of Morocco (2017–2021)
Aziz Akhannouch, Head of Government of Morocco (2021–present)

President – Filipe Nyusi, President of Mozambique (2015–present)
Prime Minister – Carlos Agostinho do Rosário, Prime Minister of Mozambique (2015–2022)

President – Hage Geingob, President of Namibia (2015–present)
Prime Minister – Saara Kuugongelwa, Prime Minister of Namibia (2015–present)

President –
 Mahamadou Issoufou, President of Niger (2011–2021)
 Mohamed Bazoum, President of Niger (2021–present)
Prime Minister – 
Brigi Rafini, Prime Minister of Niger (2011–2021)
Ouhoumoudou Mahamadou, Prime Minister of Niger (2021–present)

President – Muhammadu Buhari, President of Nigeria (2015–present)

President – Paul Kagame, President of Rwanda (2000–present)
Prime Minister – Édouard Ngirente, Prime Minister of Rwanda (2017–present)
 (self-declared, partially recognised state)
President – Brahim Ghali, President of the Sahrawi Arab Democratic Republic (2016–present)
Prime Minister – Bouchraya Hammoudi Bayoun, Prime Minister of the Sahrawi Arab Democratic Republic (2020–present)

President – 
Evaristo Carvalho, President of São Tomé and Príncipe (2016–2021)
Carlos Vila Nova, President of São Tomé and Príncipe (2021–present)
Prime Minister – Jorge Bom Jesus, Prime Minister of São Tomé and Príncipe (2018–present)

President – Macky Sall, President of Senegal (2012–present)

President – Wavel Ramkalawan, President of Seychelles (2020–present)

President – Julius Maada Bio, President of Sierra Leone (2018–present)
Chief Minister – 
David J. Francis, Chief Minister of Sierra Leone (2018–2021)
Jacob Jusu Saffa, Chief Minister of Sierra Leone (2021–present)

President – Mohamed Abdullahi Mohamed, President of Somalia (2017–present)
Prime Minister – Mohamed Hussein Roble, Prime Minister of Somalia (2020–present)
 (unrecognized, secessionist state)
President – Muse Bihi Abdi, President of Somaliland (2017–present)

President – Cyril Ramaphosa, President of South Africa (2018–present)

President – Salva Kiir Mayardit, President of South Sudan (2005–present)

President – Abdel Fattah al-Burhan, Chairman of the Transitional Sovereignty Council (2019–present)
Prime Minister – 
Abdalla Hamdok, Prime Minister of Sudan (2019–2021)
Abdalla Hamdok, Prime Minister of Sudan (2021–2022)

President – 
John Magufuli, President of Tanzania (2015–2021)
Samia Suluhu, President of Tanzania (2021–present)
Prime Minister – Kassim Majaliwa, Prime Minister of Tanzania (2015–present)

President – Faure Gnassingbé, President of Togo (2005–present)
Prime Minister – Victoire Tomegah Dogbé, Prime Minister of Togo (2020–present)

President – Kais Saied, President of Tunisia (2019–present)
Prime Minister – 
Hichem Mechichi, Head of Government of Tunisia (2020–2021)
Najla Bouden, Head of Government of Tunisia (2021–present)

President – Yoweri Museveni, President of Uganda (1986–present)
Prime Minister – 
Ruhakana Rugunda, Prime Minister of Uganda (2014–2021)
Robinah Nabbanja, Prime Minister of Uganda (2021–present)

President –
 Edgar Lungu, President of Zambia (2015–2021)
 Hakainde Hichilema, President of Zambia (2021–present)

President – Emmerson Mnangagwa, President of Zimbabwe (2017–present)

Asia
 Afghanistan
  
President – Ashraf Ghani, President of Afghanistan (2014–2021)
 
Supreme Leader – Hibatullah Akhundzada, Supreme Leader of Afghanistan (2021–present)
Prime Minister – Hasan Akhund, Acting Prime Minister of Afghanistan (2021–present)

Monarch – Sheikh Hamad bin Isa Al Khalifa, King of Bahrain (1999–present)
Prime Minister – Prince Salman bin Hamad Al Khalifa, Prime Minister of Bahrain (2020–present)

President – Abdul Hamid, President of Bangladesh (2013–present)
Prime Minister – Sheikh Hasina, Prime Minister of Bangladesh (2009–present)

Monarch – Jigme Khesar Namgyel Wangchuck, King of Bhutan (2006–present)
Prime Minister – Lotay Tshering, Prime Minister of Bhutan (2018–present)

Monarch – Hassanal Bolkiah, Sultan of Brunei (1967–present)
Prime Minister – Hassanal Bolkiah, Prime Minister of Brunei (1984–present)

Monarch – Norodom Sihamoni, King of Cambodia (2004–present)
Prime Minister – Hun Sen, Prime Minister of Cambodia (1985–present)

Communist Party Leader – Xi Jinping, General Secretary of the Chinese Communist Party (2012–present)
President – Xi Jinping, President of China (2013–present)
Premier – Li Keqiang, Premier of the State Council of China (2013–present)

President – Francisco Guterres, President of East Timor (2017–2022)
Prime Minister – Taur Matan Ruak, Prime Minister of East Timor (2018–present)

President – Ram Nath Kovind, President of India (2017–2022)
Prime Minister – Narendra Modi, Prime Minister of India (2014–present)

President – Joko Widodo, President of Indonesia (2014–present)

Supreme Leader – Ayatollah Ali Khamenei, Supreme Leader of Iran (1989–present)
President –
 Hassan Rouhani, President of Iran (2013–2021)
 Ebrahim Raisi, President of Iran (2021–present)

President – Barham Salih, President of Iraq (2018–2022)
Prime Minister – Mustafa Al-Kadhimi, Prime Minister of Iraq (2020–2022)

President – 
Reuven Rivlin, President of Israel (2014–2021)
Isaac Herzog, President of Israel (2021–present)
Prime Minister – 
Benjamin Netanyahu, Prime Minister of Israel (2009–2021)
Naftali Bennett, Prime Minister of Israel (2021–2022)

Monarch – Naruhito, Emperor of Japan (2019–present)
Prime Minister –
 Yoshihide Suga, Prime Minister of Japan (2020–2021)
 Fumio Kishida, Prime Minister of Japan (2021–present)

Monarch – Abdullah II, King of Jordan (1999–present)
Prime Minister – Bisher Al-Khasawneh, Prime Minister of Jordan (2020–present)

President – Kassym-Dzomart Tokayev, President of Kazakhstan (2019–present)
Prime Minister – Askar Mamin, Prime Minister of Kazakhstan (2019–2021)

Communist Party Leader – Kim Jong-un, General Secretary of the Workers' Party of Korea (2012–present)
De facto Head of State – Kim Jong-un, Chairman of the State Affairs Commission of North Korea (2011–present)
De jure Head of State – Choe Ryong-hae, Chairman of the Standing Committee of the Supreme People's Assembly of North Korea (2019–present)
Premier – Kim Tok-hun, Premier of the Cabinet of North Korea (2020–present)

President – Moon Jae-in, President of South Korea (2017–2022)
Prime Minister  – 
Chung Sye-kyun, Prime Minister of South Korea (2020–2021)
Hong Nam-ki, Acting Prime Minister of South Korea (2021)
 Kim Boo-kyum, Prime Minister of South Korea (2021–2022)

Monarch – Sheikh Nawaf Al-Ahmad Al-Jaber Al-Sabah, Emir of Kuwait (2020–present)
Prime Minister – Sheikh Sabah Al-Khalid Al-Sabah, Prime Minister of Kuwait (2019–present)

President –
Talant Mamytov, Acting President of Kyrgyzstan (2020–2021)
Sadyr Dzaparov, President of Kyrgyzstan (2021–present)
Prime Minister –
Sadyr Dzaparov, Prime Minister of Kyrgyzstan (2020–2021)
Artyom Novikov, Acting Prime Minister of Kyrgyzstan (2020–2021)
Ulukbek Maripov, Prime Minister/Chairman of the Cabinet of Ministers of Kyrgyzstan (2021)
Akylbek Dzaparov, Chairman of the Cabinet of Ministers of Kyrgyzstan (2021–present)

Communist Party Leader –
Bounnhang Vorachit, General Secretary of the Lao People's Revolutionary Party (2016–2021)
Thongloun Sisoulith, General Secretary of the Lao People's Revolutionary Party (2021–present)
President – 
Bounnhang Vorachit, President of Laos (2016–2021)
Thongloun Sisoulith, President of Laos (2021–present)
Prime Minister –
Thongloun Sisoulith, Prime Minister of Laos (2016–2021)
Phankham Viphavanh, Prime Minister of Laos (2021–2022)

President – Michel Aoun, President of Lebanon (2016–2022)
Prime Minister – 
 Hassan Diab, President of the Council of Ministers (2020–2021)
 Najib Mikati, President of the Council of Ministers (2021–present)

Monarch – Abdullah, Yang di-Pertuan Agong of Malaysia (2019–present)
Prime Minister –
Muhyiddin Yassin, Prime Minister of Malaysia (2020–2021)
Ismail Sabri Yaakob, Prime Minister of Malaysia (2021–2022)

President – Ibrahim Mohamed Solih, President of the Maldives (2018–present)

President –
 Khaltmaagiin Battulga, President of Mongolia (2017–2021)
 Ukhnaagiin Khürelsükh, President of Mongolia (2021–present)
Prime Minister –
Ukhnaagiin Khürelsükh, Prime Minister of Mongolia (2017–2021)
Luvsannamsrain Oyun-Erdene, Prime Minister of Mongolia (2021–present)

President –
Win Myint, President of Myanmar (2018–2021)
Myint Swe, Acting President of Myanmar (2021–present)
Junta leader – Min Aung Hlaing, Chairman of the State Administration Council (2021–present)
Prime Minister –
Aung San Suu Kyi, State Counsellor of Myanmar (2016–2021)
Min Aung Hlaing, Prime Minister of Myanmar (2021–present)

President – Bidhya Devi Bhandari, President of Nepal (2015–present)
Prime Minister – 
KP Sharma Oli, Prime Minister of Nepal (2018–2021)
Sher Bahadur Deuba, Prime Minister of Nepal (2021–2022)

Monarch – Haitham bin Tariq Al Said, Sultan of Oman (2020–present)
Prime Minister – Haitham bin Tariq Al Said, Prime Minister of Oman (2020–present)

President – Arif Alvi, President of Pakistan (2018–present)
Prime Minister – Imran Khan, Prime Minister of Pakistan (2018–2022)

President – Mahmoud Abbas, President of Palestine (2005–present)
Prime Minister – Mohammad Shtayyeh, Prime Minister of Palestine (2019–present)

President – Rodrigo Duterte, President of the Philippines (2016–2022)

Monarch – Sheikh Tamim bin Hamad Al Thani, Emir of Qatar (2013–present)
Prime Minister – Sheikh Khalid bin Khalifa bin Abdul Aziz Al Thani, Prime Minister of Qatar (2020–2023)

Monarch – Salman, King of Saudi Arabia (2015–present)
Prime Minister – Salman, Prime Minister of Saudi Arabia (2015–2022)

President – Halimah Yacob, President of Singapore (2017–present)
Prime Minister – Lee Hsien Loong, Prime Minister of Singapore (2004–present)

President – Gotabaya Rajapaksa, President of Sri Lanka (2019–2022)
Prime Minister – Mahinda Rajapaksa, Prime Minister of Sri Lanka (2019–2022)
Syria

President – Bashar al-Assad, President of Syria (2000–present)
Prime Minister – Hussein Arnous, Prime Minister of Syria (2020–present)
 Syrian opposition
 (partially recognised, rival government)
President – 
Naser al-Hariri, President of the Syrian National Coalition (2020–2021)
Salem al-Meslet, President of the Syrian National Coalition (2021–present)
Prime Minister – Abdurrahman Mustafa, Prime Minister of the Syrian National Coalition (2019–present)
 Syrian Salvation Government (rival government)
Prime Minister – Ali Keda, Prime Minister of the Syrian Salvation Government (2019-present)

President – Tsai Ing-wen, President of Taiwan (2016–present)
Premier – Su Tseng-chang, President of the Executive Yuan of Taiwan (2019–2023)

President – Emomali Rahmon, President of Tajikistan (1992–present)
Prime Minister – Kokhir Rasulzoda, Prime Minister of Tajikistan (2013–present)

Monarch – Vajiralongkorn, King of Thailand (2016–present)
Prime Minister – Prayut Chan-o-cha, Prime Minister of Thailand (2014–present)

President – Recep Tayyip Erdoğan, President of Turkey (2014–present)

President – Gurbanguly Berdimuhamedow, President of Turkmenistan (2006–2022)

President – Sheikh Khalifa bin Zayed Al Nahyan, President of the United Arab Emirates (2004–2022)
Prime Minister – Sheikh Mohammed bin Rashid Al Maktoum, Prime Minister of the United Arab Emirates (2006–present)

President – Shavkat Mirziyoyev, President of Uzbekistan (2016–present)
Prime Minister – Abdulla Aripov, Prime Minister of Uzbekistan (2016–present)

Communist Party Leader – Nguyễn Phú Trọng, General Secretary of the Communist Party of Vietnam (2011–present)
President – 
Nguyễn Phú Trọng, President of Vietnam (2018–2021)
Nguyễn Xuân Phúc, President of Vietnam (2021–2023)
Prime Minister – 
Nguyễn Xuân Phúc, Prime Minister of Vietnam (2016–2021)
Phạm Minh Chính, Prime Minister of Vietnam (2021–present)
Yemen

President – Abdrabbuh Mansur Hadi, President of Yemen (2012–present)
Prime Minister – Maeen Abdulmalik Saeed, Prime Minister of Yemen (2018–present)
  Supreme Political Council (unrecognised, rival government)
Head of State – Mahdi al-Mashat, Head of the Supreme Political Council of Yemen (2018–present)
Prime Minister – Abdel-Aziz bin Habtour, Prime Minister of Yemen (2016–present)

Europe
 (partially recognised, secessionist state)
President – Aslan Bzhania, President of Abkhazia (2020–present)
Prime Minister – Aleksander Ankvab, Prime Minister of Abkhazia  (2020–present)

President – Ilir Meta, President of Albania (2017–present)
Prime Minister – Edi Rama, Prime Minister of Albania (2013–present)

Monarchs –
French Co-Prince – Emmanuel Macron, French Co-prince of Andorra (2017–present)
Co-Prince's Representative – Patrick Strzoda (2017–present)
Episcopal Co-Prince – Archbishop Joan Enric Vives Sicília, Episcopal Co-prince of Andorra (2003–present)
Co-Prince's Representative – Josep Maria Mauri (2012–present)
Prime Minister – Xavier Espot Zamora, Head of Government of Andorra (2019–present)

President – Armen Sarkissian, President of Armenia (2018–2022)
Prime Minister – Nikol Pashinyan, Prime Minister of Armenia (2018–present)
 (unrecognised, secessionist state)
President – Arayik Harutyunyan, President of Artsakh (2020–present)

President – Alexander Van der Bellen, Federal President of Austria (2017–present)
Chancellor –
 Sebastian Kurz, Federal Chancellor of Austria (2020–2021)
 Alexander Schallenberg, Federal Chancellor of Austria (2021)
 Karl Nehammer, Federal Chancellor of Austria (2021–present)

President – Ilham Aliyev, President of Azerbaijan (2003–present)
Prime Minister – Ali Asadov, Prime Minister of Azerbaijan (2019–present)

President – Alexander Lukashenko, President of Belarus (1994–present)
Prime Minister – Roman Golovchenko, Prime Minister of Belarus (2020–present)

Monarch – Philippe, King of the Belgians (2013–present)
Prime Minister – Alexander De Croo, Prime Minister of Belgium (2020–present)

Head of State – Presidency of Bosnia and Herzegovina
Bosniak Member – Šefik Džaferović (2018–2022) 
Croat Member – Željko Komšić (2018–present: Chairman of the Presidency of Bosnia and Herzegovina, 2021–2022)
Serb Member – Milorad Dodik (2018–2022: Chairman of the Presidency of Bosnia and Herzegovina, 2020–2021)
Prime Minister – Zoran Tegeltija, Chairman of the Council of Ministers of Bosnia and Herzegovina (2019–2023)
High Representative – 
Valentin Inzko, High Representative for Bosnia and Herzegovina (2009–2021)
Christian Schmidt, High Representative for Bosnia and Herzegovina (2021–present)

President – Rumen Radev, President of Bulgaria (2017–present)
Prime Minister – 
Boyko Borisov, Prime Minister of Bulgaria (2017–2021)
Stefan Yanev, Acting Prime Minister of Bulgaria (2021)
Kiril Petkov, Prime Minister of Bulgaria (2021–present)

President – Zoran Milanović, President of Croatia (2020–present)
Prime Minister – Andrej Plenković, Prime Minister of Croatia (2016–present)

President – Nicos Anastasiades, President of Cyprus (2013–present)

President – Miloš Zeman, President of the Czech Republic (2013–present)
Prime Minister – 
Andrej Babiš, Prime Minister of the Czech Republic (2017–2021)
Petr Fiala, Prime Minister of the Czech Republic (2021–present)

Monarch – Margrethe II, Queen of Denmark (1972–present)
Prime Minister – Mette Frederiksen, Prime Minister of Denmark (2019–present)
 (unrecognised, secessionist state)
President – Denis Pushilin, President of Donetsk People's Republic (2018–present)
Prime Minister – Alexander Ananchenko, Prime Minister of Donetsk People's Republic (2018–present)

President –
 Kersti Kaljulaid, President of Estonia (2016–2021)
 Alar Karis, President of Estonia (2021–present)
Prime Minister –
Jüri Ratas, Prime Minister of Estonia (2016–2021)
Kaja Kallas, Prime Minister of Estonia (2021–present)

President – Sauli Niinistö, President of Finland (2012–present)
Prime Minister – Sanna Marin, Prime Minister of Finland (2019–present)

President – Emmanuel Macron, President of France (2017–present)
Prime Minister – Jean Castex, Prime Minister of France (2020–present)

President – Salome Zurabishvili, President of Georgia (2018–present)
Prime Minister –
 Giorgi Gakharia, Prime Minister of Georgia (2019–2021)
 Irakli Garibashvili, Prime Minister of Georgia (2021–present)

President – Frank-Walter Steinmeier, Federal President of Germany (2017–present)
Chancellor – 
Angela Merkel, Federal Chancellor of Germany (2005–2021)
Olaf Scholz, Federal Chancellor of Germany (2021–present)

President – Katerina Sakellaropoulou, President of Greece (2020–present)
Prime Minister – Kyriakos Mitsotakis, Prime Minister of Greece (2019–present)

President – János Áder, President of Hungary (2012–present)
Prime Minister – Viktor Orbán, Prime Minister of Hungary (2010–present)

President – Guðni Th. Jóhannesson, President of Iceland (2016–present)
Prime Minister – Katrín Jakobsdóttir, Prime Minister of Iceland (2017–present)

President – Michael D. Higgins, President of Ireland (2011–present)
Prime Minister – Micheál Martin, Taoiseach of Ireland (2020–2022)

President – Sergio Mattarella, President of Italy (2015–present)
Prime Minister –
 Giuseppe Conte, President of the Council of Ministers of Italy (2018–2021)
 Mario Draghi, President of the Council of Ministers of Italy (2021–present)
 (partially recognised, secessionist state; under nominal international administration)
President – 
Vjosa Osmani, Acting President of Kosovo (2020–2021)
Glauk Konjufca, Acting President of Kosovo (2021)
Vjosa Osmani, President of Kosovo (2021–present)
Prime Minister –
Avdullah Hoti, Prime Minister of Kosovo (2020–2021)
Albin Kurti, Prime Minister of Kosovo (2021–present)
UN Special Representative – Zahir Tanin, Special Representative of the UN Secretary-General for Kosovo (2015–present)

President – Egils Levits, President of Latvia (2019–present)
Prime Minister – Krišjānis Kariņš, Prime Minister of Latvia (2019–present)

Monarch – Hans-Adam II, Prince Regnant of Liechtenstein (1989–present)
Regent – Hereditary Prince Alois, Regent of Liechtenstein (2004–present)
Prime Minister – 
Adrian Hasler, Head of Government of Liechtenstein (2013–2021)
Daniel Risch, Head of Government of Liechtenstein (2021–present)

President – Gitanas Nausėda, President of Lithuania (2019–present)
Prime Minister – Ingrida Šimonytė, Prime Minister of Lithuania (2020–present)
 Luhansk People's Republic (unrecognised, secessionist state)
President – Leonid Pasechnik, Head of state of Luhansk People's Republic (2017–present)
Prime Minister – Sergey Kozlov, Prime Minister of Luhansk People's Republic (2015–present)

Monarch – Henri, Grand Duke of Luxembourg (2000–present)
Prime Minister – Xavier Bettel, Prime Minister of Luxembourg (2013–present)

President – George Vella, President of Malta (2019–present)
Prime Minister – Robert Abela, Prime Minister of Malta (2020–present)

President – Maia Sandu, President of Moldova (2020–present)
Prime Minister – 
Aureliu Ciocoi, Acting Prime Minister of Moldova (2021)
Natalia Gavrilița, Prime Minister of Moldova (2021–2023)

Monarch – Albert II, Sovereign Prince of Monaco (2005–present)
Prime Minister – Pierre Dartout, Minister of State of Monaco (2020–present)

President – Milo Đukanović, President of Montenegro (2018–present)
Prime Minister – Zdravko Krivokapić, Prime Minister of Montenegro (2020–present)

Monarch – Willem-Alexander, King of the Netherlands (2013–present)
Chairman of the Council of Ministers – Mark Rutte, Prime Minister of the Netherlands (2010–present)

President – Stevo Pendarovski, President of North Macedonia (2019–present)
Prime Minister – Zoran Zaev, President of the Government of North Macedonia (2020–2022)
 (unrecognised, secessionist state)
President – Ersin Tatar, President of Northern Cyprus (2020–present)
Prime Minister – 
Ersan Saner, Prime Minister of Northern Cyprus (2020–2021)
Faiz Sucuoğlu, Prime Minister of Northern Cyprus (2021–present)

Monarch – Harald V, King of Norway (1991–present)
Prime Minister – 
Erna Solberg, Prime Minister of Norway (2013–2021)
Jonas Gahr Støre, Prime Minister of Norway (2021–present)

President – Andrzej Duda, President of Poland (2015–present)
Prime Minister – Mateusz Morawiecki, Chairman of the Council of Ministers of Poland (2017–present)

President – Marcelo Rebelo de Sousa, President of Portugal (2016–present)
Prime Minister – António Costa, Prime Minister of Portugal (2015–present)

President – Klaus Iohannis, President of Romania (2014–present)
Prime Minister – 
Florin Cîțu, Prime Minister of Romania (2020–2021)
Nicolae Ciucă, Prime Minister of Romania (2021–present)

President – Vladimir Putin, President of Russia (2012–present)
Prime Minister – Mikhail Mishustin, Chairman of the Government of Russia (2020–present) 

Captains-Regent – 
Alessandro Cardelli and Mirko Dolcini, Captains Regent of San Marino (2020–2021)
Gian Carlo Venturini and Marco Nicolini, Captains Regent of San Marino (2021)
Francesco Mussoni and Giacomo Simoncini, Captains Regent of San Marino (2021–present)

President – Aleksandar Vučić, President of Serbia (2017–present)
Prime Minister – Ana Brnabić, Prime Minister of Serbia (2017–present)

President – Zuzana Čaputová, President of Slovakia (2019–present)
Prime Minister – 
Igor Matovič, Prime Minister of Slovakia (2020–2021)
Eduard Heger, Prime Minister of Slovakia (2021–present)

President – Borut Pahor, President of Slovenia (2012–2022)
Prime Minister – Janez Janša, Prime Minister of Slovenia (2020–2022)
 (partially recognised, secessionist state)
President – Anatoliy Bibilov, President of South Ossetia (2017–present)
Prime Minister – Gennady Bekoyev, Prime Minister of South Ossetia (2020–present)

Monarch – Felipe VI, King of Spain (2014–present)
Prime Minister – Pedro Sánchez, President of the Government of Spain (2018–present)

Monarch – Carl XVI Gustaf, King of Sweden (1973–present)
Prime Minister – 
Stefan Löfven, Prime Minister of Sweden (2014–2021)
Magdalena Andersson, Prime Minister of Sweden (2021–present)

Council – Federal Council of Switzerland
Members –  Ueli Maurer (2009–2022), Simonetta Sommaruga (2010–2022), Alain Berset (2012–present), Guy Parmelin (2016–present; President of Switzerland, 2021–present), Ignazio Cassis (2017–present), Karin Keller-Sutter  (2019–present) and Viola Amherd (2019–present)
 (unrecognized, secessionist state)
President – Vadim Krasnoselsky, President of Transnistria (2016–present)
Prime Minister – Aleksandr Martynov, Prime Minister of Transnistria (2016–present)

President – Volodymyr Zelenskyy, President of Ukraine (2019–present)
Prime Minister – Denys Shmyhal, Prime Minister of Ukraine (2020–present)

Monarch – Elizabeth II, Queen of the United Kingdom (1952–2022)
Prime Minister – Boris Johnson, Prime Minister of the United Kingdom (2019–2022)

Monarch – Pope Francis, Sovereign of Vatican City (2013–present)
Head of Government – 
Cardinal Giuseppe Bertello, President of the Governorate of Vatican City (2011–2021)
Cardinal Fernando Vérgez Alzaga, President of the Governorate of Vatican City (2021–present)
Holy See (sui generis subject of public international law)
Secretary of State – Cardinal Pietro Parolin, Cardinal Secretary of State (2013–present)

North America

Monarch – Elizabeth II, Queen of Antigua and Barbuda (1981–2022)
Governor-General – Sir Rodney Williams, Governor-General of Antigua and Barbuda (2014–present)
Prime Minister – Gaston Browne, Prime Minister of Antigua and Barbuda (2014–present)

Monarch – Elizabeth II, Queen of the Bahamas (1973–2022)
Governor-General – Sir Cornelius A. Smith, Governor-General of the Bahamas (2019–present)
Prime Minister – 
Hubert Minnis, Prime Minister of the Bahamas (2017–2021)
Philip Davis, Prime Minister of the Bahamas (2021–present)

Monarch – Elizabeth II, Queen of Barbados (1966–2021)
Governor-General – Dame Sandra Mason, Governor-General of Barbados (2018–2021)
President – Dame Sandra Mason, President of Barbados (2021–present)
Prime Minister – Mia Mottley, Prime Minister of Barbados (2018–present)

Monarch – Elizabeth II, Queen of Belize (1981–2022)
Governor-General – 
Sir Colville Young, Governor-General of Belize (1993–2021)
Stuart Leslie, Acting Governor-General of Belize (2021)
Froyla Tzalam, Governor-General of Belize (2021–present)
Prime Minister – Johnny Briceño, Prime Minister of Belize (2020–present)

Monarch – Elizabeth II, Queen of Canada (1952–2022)
Governor General –
Julie Payette, Governor General of Canada (2017–2021)
Richard Wagner, Administrator of the Government of Canada (2021)
Mary Simon, Governor General of Canada (2021–present)
Prime Minister – Justin Trudeau, Prime Minister of Canada (2015–present)

President – Carlos Alvarado Quesada, President of Costa Rica (2018–present)

Communist Party Leader – 
Raúl Castro, First Secretary of the Communist Party of Cuba (2011–2021)
Miguel Díaz-Canel, First Secretary of the Communist Party of Cuba (2021–present)
President – Miguel Díaz-Canel, President of Cuba (2018–present)
Prime Minister – Manuel Marrero Cruz, Prime Minister (2019–present)

President – Charles Savarin, President of Dominica (2013–present)
Prime Minister – Roosevelt Skerrit, Prime Minister of Dominica (2004–present)

President – Luis Abinader, President of the Dominican Republic (2020–present)

President – Nayib Bukele, President of El Salvador (2019–present)

Monarch – Elizabeth II, Queen of Grenada (1974–2022)
Governor-General – Dame Cécile La Grenade, Governor-General of Grenada (2013–present)
Prime Minister – Keith Mitchell, Prime Minister of Grenada (2013–2022)

President – Alejandro Giammattei, President of Guatemala (2020–present)

President –
Jovenel Moïse, President of Haiti (2017–2021)
Vacant (2021–present)
Prime Minister – 
Joseph Jouthe, Prime Minister of Haiti (2020–2021)
Claude Joseph, Acting Prime Minister of Haiti (2021)
Ariel Henry, Acting Prime Minister of Haiti (2021–present)

President – Juan Orlando Hernández, President of Honduras (2014–2022)

Monarch – Elizabeth II, Queen of Jamaica (1962–2022)
Governor-General – Sir Patrick Allen, Governor-General of Jamaica (2009–present)
Prime Minister – Andrew Holness, Prime Minister of Jamaica (2016–present)

President – Andrés Manuel López Obrador, President of Mexico (2018–present)

President – Daniel Ortega, President of Nicaragua (2007–present)

President – Laurentino Cortizo, President of Panama (2019–present)

Monarch – Elizabeth II, Queen of Saint Kitts and Nevis (1983–2022)
Governor-General – Sir Tapley Seaton, Governor-General of Saint Kitts and Nevis (2015–2023)
Prime Minister – Timothy Harris, Prime Minister of Saint Kitts and Nevis (2015–present)

Monarch – Elizabeth II, Queen of Saint Lucia (1979–2022)
Governor-General – 
Sir Neville Cenac, Governor-General of Saint Lucia  (2018–2021)
Errol Charles, Acting Governor-General of Saint Lucia  (2021–present)
Prime Minister –
 Allen Chastanet, Prime Minister of Saint Lucia (2016–2021)
 Philip Pierre, Prime Minister of Saint Lucia (2021–present)

Monarch – Elizabeth II, Queen of Saint Vincent and the Grenadines (1979–2022)
Governor-General – Susan Dougan, Governor-General of Saint Vincent and the Grenadines (2019–present)
Prime Minister – Ralph Gonsalves, Prime Minister of Saint Vincent and the Grenadines (2001–present)

President – Paula-Mae Weekes, President of Trinidad and Tobago (2018–present)
Prime Minister – Keith Rowley, Prime Minister of Trinidad and Tobago (2015–present)

President –
Donald Trump, President of the United States (2017–2021)
Joe Biden, President of the United States (2021–present)

Oceania

Monarch – Elizabeth II, Queen of Australia (1952–2022)
Governor-General – David Hurley, Governor-General of Australia (2019–present)
Prime Minister – Scott Morrison, Prime Minister of Australia (2018–2022)

President – 
Jioji Konrote, President of Fiji (2015–2021)
Wiliame Katonivere, President of Fiji (2021–present)
Prime Minister – Frank Bainimarama, Prime Minister of Fiji (2007–2022)

President – Taneti Mamau, President of Kiribati (2016–present)

President – David Kabua, President of the Marshall Islands (2020–present)

President – David W. Panuelo, President of Micronesia (2019–present)

President – Lionel Aingimea, President of Nauru (2019–2022)

Monarch – Elizabeth II, Queen of New Zealand (1952–2022)
Governor General –
Dame Patsy Reddy, Governor-General of New Zealand (2016–2021)
Dame Helen Winkelmann, Administrator of the Government of New Zealand (2021)
Dame Cindy Kiro, Governor-General of New Zealand (2021–present)
Prime Minister – Jacinda Ardern, Prime Minister of New Zealand (2017–2023)

President –
 Tommy Remengesau, President of Palau (2013–2021)
 Surangel Whipps Jr., President of Palau (2021–present)

Monarch – Elizabeth II, Queen of Papua New Guinea (1975–2022)
Governor-General – Sir Bob Dadae, Governor-General of Papua New Guinea (2017–present)
Prime Minister – James Marape, Prime Minister of Papua New Guinea (2019–present)

Head of State – Tuimalealiʻifano Vaʻaletoʻa Sualauvi II, O le Ao o le Malo of Samoa (2017–present)
Prime Minister – 
Tuila'epa Sa'ilele Malielegaoi, Prime Minister of Samoa (1998–2021)
Fiamē Naomi Mataʻafa, Prime Minister of Samoa (2021–present)

Monarch – Elizabeth II, Queen of the Solomon Islands (1978–2022)
Governor-General – Sir David Vunagi, Governor-General of the Solomon Islands (2019–present)
Prime Minister – Manasseh Sogavare, Prime Minister of the Solomon Islands (2019–present)

Monarch – Tupou VI, King of Tonga (2012–present)
Prime Minister –
Pōhiva Tuʻiʻonetoa, Prime Minister of Tonga (2019–2021)
Siaosi Sovaleni, Prime Minister of Tonga (2021-present)

Monarch – Elizabeth II, Queen of Tuvalu (1978–2022)
Governor-General – 
Teniku Talesi Honolulu, Acting Governor-General of Tuvalu (2019–2021)
Samuelu Teo, Acting Governor-General of Tuvalu (2021)
Tofiga Vaevalu Falani, Governor-General of Tuvalu (2021–present)
Prime Minister – Kausea Natano, Prime Minister of Tuvalu (2019–present)

President – Tallis Obed Moses, President of Vanuatu (2017–2022)
Prime Minister – Bob Loughman, Prime Minister of Vanuatu (2020–2022)

South America

President – Alberto Fernández, President of Argentina (2019–present)

President – Luis Arce, President of Bolivia (2020–present)

President – Jair Bolsonaro, President of Brazil (2019–2022)

President – Sebastián Piñera, President of Chile (2018–2022)

President – Iván Duque Márquez, President of Colombia (2018–2022)

President –
Lenín Moreno, President of Ecuador (2017–2021)
Guillermo Lasso, President of Ecuador (2021–present)

President – Irfaan Ali, President of Guyana (2020–present)
Prime Minister – Mark Phillips, Prime Minister of Guyana (2020–present)

President – Mario Abdo Benítez, President of Paraguay (2018–present)

President –
 Francisco Sagasti, Interim President of Peru (2020–2021)
 Pedro Castillo, President of Peru (2021–2022)
Prime Minister – 
Violeta Bermúdez, President of the Council of Ministers of Peru (2020–2021)
Guido Bellido, President of the Council of Ministers of Peru (2021)
Mirtha Vásquez, President of the Council of Ministers of Peru (2021–2022)

President – Chan Santokhi, President of Suriname (2020–present)

President – Luis Lacalle Pou, President of Uruguay (2020–present)
Venezuela

President – Nicolás Maduro, President of Venezuela (2013–present)
 Venezuelan opposition (partially recognised, rival government)
President – Juan Guaidó, President of the National Assembly (2019–present)

See also
List of current heads of state and government

Notes

References

External links
CIDOB Foundation contextualised biographies of world political leaders
Portale Storia a list of current rulers by country
Rulersa list of rulers throughout time and places
WorldStatesmenan online encyclopedia of the leaders of nations and territories

State leaders
State leaders
State leaders
2021